Köstinger is a German language surname.

People with the surname 

 Elisabeth Köstinger (born 1978), Austrian politician
 Hubert Köstinger (born 1914), Austrian skier
 Willy Köstinger (1940–2014), Austrian skier

See also 

 Ottinger

Surnames
Surnames of German origin
German-language surnames